2011 LATAM Challenge Series season was the fourth season of LATAM Challenge Series. The season started on April 9, and finished on November 20. There was nine double events, seven in Mexico and two in USA (both in Texas). The Venezuelan driver Giancarlo Serenelli retained the championship with seven victories in the season. He also runs in Super Copa Telcel.

Cars
For this season the cars were powered by 2019 cm3 L4 Volkswagen FSI Motors. Tatuus chassis are used. Kumho Tires supplies the tires.

Drivers

Schedule

The 2011 schedule was presented in February. LATAM will run in the Autódromo Hermanos Rodríguez for first time, and return to Texas for two races. On May 25, LATAM organization announces a change in the third race from Tuxtla Gutiérrez to Toluca by the track conditions.

Results

Races

Race summaries

Round 1: Puebla Grand Challenge

Standings

Point scoring system:
 Points are awarded based on each driver's resulting place (regardless of whether the car is running at the end of the race):

Bonus points:
 2 for Fastest Lap
 2 for Pole Position

References

LATAM Challenge Series
LATAM Challenge Series races
2011 in North American sport
2011 in Mexican motorsport